André Major (born April 22, 1942) is a Canadian writer from Quebec. He is most noted for his novel Les Rescapés, which won the Governor General's Award for French-language fiction at the 1976 Governor General's Awards. He was later nominated in the same category at the 1987 Governor General's Awards for L'Hiver au cœur and at the 1995 Governor General's Awards for La Vie provisoire, and for the Governor General's Award for French-language non-fiction at the 2008 Governor General's Awards for L'Esprit vagabond.

A poet in the early 1960s, he was a founding member alongside Paul Chamberland, André Brochu, Pierre Maheu and Jean-Marc Piotte of the political and cultural magazine Parti pris in 1963. In his early career he also wrote a number of radio and stage plays and numerous short stories. He also worked as a radio producer for Radio-Canada.

He was awarded the Prix Athanase-David in 1992.

His most recent novel, À quoi ça rime?, was published in 2013.

Works
 Le Froid se meurt (1961)
 Holocauste à 2 voix (1961)
 Le Cabochon (1964)
 Poèmes pour durer (1969)
 Le Désir and Le Perdant, pièces radiophoniques (1973)
 La chair de poule (1973)
 L'Épouvantail (1974)
 L'Épidémie (1975)
 Une Soirée en octobre (1975)
 Les Rescapés (1976)
 L'Hiver au cœur (1987)
 Histoires de déserteurs (1991)
 La Vie provisoire (1995)
 La Folle d'Elvis (1997)
 Le Vent du diable (1998)
 Le Sourire d'Anton ou L'Adieu au roman (2001)
 Nous ferons nos comptes plus tard : correspondance (1962-1983) / Jacques Ferron et André Major (2004)
 L'Esprit vagabond (2007)
 Prendre le large. Carnets 1995-2000 (2012)
 À Quoi ça rime? (2013)

References

1942 births
20th-century Canadian dramatists and playwrights
21st-century Canadian dramatists and playwrights
20th-century Canadian novelists
21st-century Canadian novelists
20th-century Canadian poets
20th-century Canadian male writers
21st-century Canadian poets
20th-century Canadian short story writers
21st-century Canadian short story writers
Canadian male dramatists and playwrights
Canadian male novelists
Canadian male poets
Canadian male short story writers
Canadian dramatists and playwrights in French
Canadian novelists in French
Canadian poets in French
Canadian short story writers in French
Canadian radio producers
Governor General's Award-winning fiction writers
Writers from Montreal
Living people
21st-century Canadian male writers